Philippot is a surname. Notable people with the surname include:

Alice Marie Yvonne Philippot (1904–1987), French/Mexican poet and artist
Charles Louis Philippot (1801-1859), French artist
Florian Philippot (born 1981),  French politician and Member of the European Parliament 
Jean-Paul Philippot (born 1960), Belgian television producer and President on the European Broadcasting Union 
Karine Laurent Philippot (born 1974), French cross country skier
Michel Philippot (1925–1996), French composer, mathematician, acoustician, musicologist, aesthetician, broadcaster  and educator

References